Acalolepta sejuncta is a species of beetle in the family Cerambycidae. It was described by Henry Walter Bates in 1873. It is known from Japan.

Subspecies
 Acalolepta sejuncta amaiana (Hayashi, 1962)
 Acalolepta sejuncta hachijoensis (Gressitt, 1956)
 Acalolepta sejuncta hamai (Hayashi, 1962)
 Acalolepta sejuncta izuinsulana Hayashi, 1968
 Acalolepta sejuncta morii Makihara, 1980
 Acalolepta sejuncta okinawensis Breuning & Ohbayashi, 1966
 Acalolepta sejuncta sejuncta Bates, 1873
 Acalolepta sejuncta tsushimae (Breuning, 1960)

References

Acalolepta
Beetles described in 1873